One Christmas is a 1994 American made-for-television drama film starring Katharine Hepburn (in her final television role), Henry Winkler and Swoosie Kurtz. It is based on the 1983 short story "One Christmas" by Truman Capote about a young boy who reluctantly leaves his Alabama home to spend Christmas with his estranged father in New Orleans. The film originally premiered on NBC on December 19, 1994.

Summary
In 1930, eight-year-old Buddy lives an idyllic existence in rural Alabama with his cousin Sook. But all that is about to change when he is sent to New Orleans to spend Christmas with his estranged father, a con artist more intent on scamming than building a relationship with his son. Although his dad has terrible problems to overcome and is busy pursuing the niece of wealthy Cornelia Beaumont, Buddy and his father take the first steps towards becoming a real family during this one Christmas they will never forget.

Cast
Katharine Hepburn as Cornelia Beaumont
Henry Winkler as Dad
Swoosie Kurtz as Emily
T.J. Lowther as Buddy
Tonea Stewart as Evangeline
Joe Maggard as Dixon Hobbs
Julie Harris as Sook

Award nomination
Hepburn was nominated for a Screen Actors Guild Award in 1995 for Outstanding Performance by a Female Actor in a Miniseries or Television Movie.

See also
 List of Christmas films

References

External links

1994 television films
1994 films
1990s Christmas drama films
American Christmas drama films
NBC network original films
Christmas television films
Films about con artists
Films based on short fiction
Films based on works by Truman Capote
Films set in 1930
Films set in Alabama
Films set in New Orleans
Films directed by Tony Bill
Films scored by Van Dyke Parks
American drama television films
1990s American films